The Pennsylvania State Chess Federation (PSCF) is the official Pennsylvania affiliate of the United States Chess Federation (US Chess).

PSCF is a 501(c)(3) non-profit organization.  PSCF sponsors about 20 annual state championship events, held throughout the state.  The Pennsylvania State Championship rotates between the eastern, central and western regions of the state each year.  PSCF publishes a quarterly newsletter, The Pennswoodpusher.

PSCF was founded in 1939, in Pittsburgh, Pennsylvania under the leadership of William M. Byland.  PSCF affiliated immediately with US Chess, which was founded the same year, and has been the official state affiliate for Pennsylvania ever since.

In 1943, the PSCF State Championship was the first championship event in USCF history to be paired with the Swiss system.  The chief director of that event was George Koltanowski.

Currently the highest-ranking member is Grandmaster Alexander Shabalov.  The state has two Grandmasters - Shabalov, and Bryan G. Smith.

The current PSCF president is Tom M. Martinak. PSCF Presidents:

2002–present:  Tom M. Martinak
1978-2002:  Ira Lee Riddle
1939-1977:  William M. Byland

PSCF State Champions 2001–present:

2016:  Grant Xu
2015:  Grant Xu
2014:  Peter Minear, Rodion Rubenchik, Ilya Shvartsman
2013:  Peter Minear
2012:  Daniel Malkiel
2011:  Peter Minear
2010:  Thomas Bartell, Alisa Melekhina
2009:  Mark Heimann
2008:  Peter Minear
2007:  Bryan Smith
2006:  Bryan Norman, Mark Heimann
2005:  Mark Eidemiller, Bryan Norman
2004:  Edward Formanek
2003:  Stanislav Kriventsov
2002:  Rodion Rubenchik, Zakhar Fayvinov, Elvin Wilson, Tom Martinak
2001:  Stanislav Kriventsov, Matthew Traldi

PSCF State Champions 1981-2000:

2000:  Stanislav Kriventsov
1999:  Stanislav Kriventsov
1998:  Edward Formanek, Rodion Rubenchik, Albert Bingaman, Jr., Marty Frank
1997:  Edward Formanek
1996:  Wesley Ward
1995:  John Hathaway, Jr.
1994:  Alexander Shabalov
1993:  Igor Khmelnitsky, Edward Formanek, Andrew Rea
1992:  Ruben Shocron, Brent Schwab
1991:  Mark Eidemiller
1990:  Vivek Rao, Stephen Rakowsky
1989:  HiTech
1988:  HiTech
1987:  Mark Eidemiller, Craig Jones, Albert Bingaman, Jr.
1986:  Karl Dehmelt, Ruben Shocron, Michael Shahade
1985:  Karl Dehmelt, William Atkinson
1984:  Edward Formanek
1983:  Igor Ivanov
1982:  Albert Bingaman, Jr.
1981:  Boris Baczynskyj

PSCF State Champions 1961-1980:

1980:  Alex Dunne
1979:  Anatoly Dozorets
1978:  John Fitzpatrick
1977:  John Fitzpatrick
1976:  Tim Taylor
1975:  Paul Cornelius
1974:  Harvey Bradlow
1973:  Jon Jacobs
1972:  Michael Shahade
1971:  Michael Shahade
1970:  Michael Shahade
1969:  Robert Bornholz
1968:  Bruce Alberston
1967:  Arnold Chertkof
1966:  Richard Abrams
1965:  Richard Abrams
1964:  Clarence Kalenian
1963:  Jeffrey Harris
1962:  Robert Bornholz
1961:  Attilio Di Camillo

PSCF State Champions 1939-1960:

1960:  Attilio Di Camillo
1959:  Joseph Schaffer
1958:  Max Cohen
1957:  Robert Bornholz
1956:  Hermann Hesse
1955:  Charles Kalme
1954:  Joseph Schaffer
1953:  Robert Sobel
1952:  Donald McClelland
1951:  William Ruth
1950:  Thomas Gutekunst
1949:  William Byland
1948:  Paul Deitz
1947:  Attilio Di Camillo
1946:  Attilio Di Camillo
1945:  Irving Heitner
1944:  Hermann Hesse
1943:  Thomas Gutekunst
1942:  William Steckel
1941:  Hermann Hesse
1940:  L. W. Gardner
1939:  William Steckel, Hermann Hesse

External links
 Pennsylvania State Chess Federation (official)
 PSCF Facebook site (official)

Chess organizations
Chess in the United States
1939 establishments in Pennsylvania